Mittenia is a genus of haplolepideous mosses (Dicranidae) with a single species, Mittenia plumula, which is the sole representative of the family Mitteniaceae in the order Pottiales.

It has luminescent protonema.

References

Monotypic moss genera
Pottiales